The Alva Review-Courier is a semi-weekly newspaper for Alva, Oklahoma, and surrounding areas. The newspaper was purchased in 1990 by Martin Broadcasting Corporation. The President is Lynn L. Martin and the vice-president is Marione E. Martin.

The Alva Review-Courier is made up of two publications. The legal newspaper entered as second class matter at the U.S. Post Office is the Alva Review-Courier. It is published Friday and Sunday. A Wednesday edition is a combined publication with the Newsgram, a total market coverage product, and carries a masthead of Alva Review-Courier/Newsgram."

History
The Northwestern Oklahoma State University library on the Alva campus contains more than 8,000 Alva newspapers that Blanche and Allen Doughty donated during the summer of 1966 to the history department of Northwestern Oklahoma State University. The newspapers include the Alva Review, Renfrew Record, Alva Record and Alva Daily Record from 1897 to 1941.

The Oklahoma Historical Society did a genealogy of Oklahoma newspapers through a grant from the Library of Congress The following information is based on a newspaper genealogy report requested from the Oklahoma Historical Society by Alva area historian Linda McGill Wagner.

The newspapers that merged to become the Alva Courier-Review of today included the Alva Daily News, published from March 5, 1908. to December 31, 1908, and the Morning Times, published from April 7, 1912, to November 21, 1914. Both were absorbed by what became the Daily Review Courier. Published by Logan A. Wilhite and edited by Kent Eubanks, the Morning Times competed with the Alva Daily Pioneer. Eubanks also published and co-edited the Alva Courier with Walter Rossin in 1907 and The Daily Times with Harry Bardshaw in 1908. The Daily Review Courier and Daily Alva Review Courier were used off and on from August 25, 1919, through April 22, 1929. In September 1929, the paper merged with the Alva Review Courier, a daily published from April 23, 1929, through June 4, 1989. On October 1, 1985, the paper used a six-column format, standard advertising unit. The newspaper was also called the Alva Review-Courier & Woods County News from June 7, 1989, through December 13, 1989. In July 1986, it changed from an evening to morning paper, published Tuesday through Friday with a Sunday edition. The paper's current name was used beginning on December 17, 1989, until today, meaning the Alva Review-Courier has provided news coverage for more than 115 years. It absorbed both the Alva Advocate and, on June 5, 1985, the Newsgram.

The paper's name can be traced back to the 1890s. A weekly publication called the Alva Courier was published in Alva, Oklahoma, beginning in 1896 (The First 100 Years of Alva, Oklahoma states it dates back to January 21, 1897). It published from January 13, 1899, to January 23, 1903. An Alva Weekly Courier published from January 30, 1903, to January 24, 1908, and then merged with the Alva Review to become the Alva Review Courier on January 31, 1908. The Alva Review had been published from July 7, 1894, through February 6, 1908. A Alva Review Courier was published from February 13, 1908, to December 31, 1914. Three other papers are worth mentioning. An Alva Weekly News was merged with the Dacoma Herald, to become the Woods County News, which published from June 20, 1968, to May 25, 1989.

Other Woods County publications

The Alva Daily Pioneer began June 24, 1901, was published from July 25, 1903, through April 9, 1906.
"Alva Pioneer" – Alva, OK, weekly, September 22, 1893, through July 9, 1897; merged with "Alva Republican" into "Alva Pioneer Republican." It was the first newspaper in Alva, Woods County, Oklahoma Territory, September 1893; W. F. Hatfield started gathering news, selling subscriptions with the assistance of Oscar Haberlein who worked at the Kiowa News in Kansas. The "Pioneer" was printed in Hazelton, Kansas, brought to Alva, O.T. and delivered to subscribers for the first 6 weeks. After that it was housed in the second story of the first two-story building (20x40 feet) built by Hatfield, around October 1893, to house his press. The "Pioneer" was the oldest, daily Democratic paper in Woods County. It was published for 10 years in its two-story location and grew from a weekly to a daily paper. Downstairs below the "Pioneer" printing office was located a restaurant opened by G. W. Drake and his wife from the Hazelton, Kansas, area.
"Alva Republican" – Alva, OK, weekly, purchased February 9, 1894, by James Kelley and J. I. Parcell, the first republican newspaper in Alva, O.T.; publication dates February 23, 1894, through July 2, 1897; merged with "Alva Pioneer" into "Alva Pioneer Republican."
"Alva Pioneer Republican" – Alva, OK, weekly, July 16, 1897, through December 24, 1897.
"Alva Pioneer" – Alva, OK, weekly, December 31, 1897, through August 16, 1901.
"Alva Weekly Pioneer" – Alva, OK, weekly, August 23, 1901, through August 27, 1909.
"Alva Pioneer" – Alva, OK, weekly, September 3, 1909, through July 7, 1911, ceased publication.
Daily Editions:
"Alva Daily Pioneer" – Alva, OK, began June 24, 1901, publication dates July 25, 1903, through April 9, 1906.
"Daily Pioneer" – Alva, OK, daily, January 14, 1911, through April 30, 1917.
"Alva Daily Pioneer" – Alva, OK, daily, publication dates April 28, 1917, through April 23, 1919. Absorbed by "Daily Review Courier" (SEE Linked Group 1).
"Ames Enterprise" – Hoyle, OK, weekly (Major county), November 15, 1901, through July 4, 1902.
"Renfrews Record" – Alva, OK, weekly, July 24, 1902, through February 25, 1921. Founded by James P. Renfrew, as a weekly in the five hundred block of Barnes Avenue
"Alva Record" – Alva, OK, weekly, February 21, 1921, through February 26, 1931. Allen Doughty bought "Renfrew Record" from Timmons & Finch of Cherokee, Oklahoma, and changed it to "Alva Record." In 1930, it was printed as a daily; changing to "Alva Daily Record."
"Alva Daily Record" – Alva, OK, daily, March 3, 1931, through December 31, 1940; located in the 600 block of Barnes Avenue. In 1941, Doughty sold it to Joe McBride and Jim Nance. Nance & McBride bought the "Review-Courier"; merging it with the "Alva Daily Record."
"Alva Weekly Record" – Alva, OK, weekly, September 19, 1946, through September 4, 1947.
"Woods County Enterprise" – Waynoka, OK, November 2, 1900, through June 6, 1935.
"Woods County Enterprise & Waynoka News" – Waynoka, OK, June 13, 1935, through April 12, 1984.
"Woods County Enterprise" – Waynoka, OK, April 19 through Present.
"Woods County Socialist" – Alva, OK, October 29, 1910, through November 26, 1910.
"Constructive Socialist" – Alva, OK, August 2, 1911, through April 23, 1913.
"Waynoka Tribune" – Waynoka OK, February 5, 1909, through February 16, 1912.
"Waynoka Democrat" – Waynoka, OK, February 22, 1912, through October 16, 1914.
"Woods County News" – Augusta, OK, August 5, 1899, through October 25, 1907.
"Alfalfa County News" – Carmen, OK, November 1, 1907, through November 22, 1912. Absorbed by "Carmen Headlight."
"Dacoma Enterprise" – Dacoma, OK, weekly, May 3, 1912, through November 9, 1917.
"Dacoma Mascot" – Dacoma, OK, weekly, November 15, 1917, through June 24, 1920.
Individual Titles (Papers):
"Alva Chronicle" – Alva, OK, December 22, 1893, through August 2, 1895. It was the first paper in Alva, O.T.; The First 100 years of Alva, Oklahoma, states that, "L. B. Wilson brought it September 21, 1893, from Crisfield, Kansas; Hatfield purchased the Alva Chronicle and merged it with the Pioneer."
"Avard Tribune" – Avard, OK, June 2, 1904, through July 26, 1918.
"Capron Hustler" – Capron, OK, June 16, 1904, through May 25, 1916.
"Dacoma News" – Dacoma, OK, February 19, 1909, through January 27, 1911.
"Daily Pioneer" – Alva, OK, January 14, 1911, through April 30, 1917.
"Freedom Booster" – Freedom, OK, October 19, 1916, through May 23, 1918.
"Freedom Call" – Freedom, OK, May 21, 1906, through November 26, 1914.
"Freedom Express" – Freedom, OK, May 21, 1906, through November 26, 1914.
"Prohibition Agitator" – Alva, OK, March 21, 1906, through June 13, 1906.
"Sun" – Dacoma, OK, October 28, 1904, through June 2, 1905.

References

Newspapers published in Oklahoma
Woods County, Oklahoma